The Western European broadleaf forests is an ecoregion in Western Europe, and parts of the Alps. It comprises temperate broadleaf and mixed forests, that cover large areas of France, Germany and the Czech Republic and more moderately sized parts of Poland, Austria, Switzerland, Belgium and South Limburg (Netherlands). Luxembourg is also part of this ecoregion.

Geography

This area has been inhabited for thousands of years and holds several large cities such as Lyon, Nancy and Munich. Most of the countryside has been cleared for agricultural land, cultivated with cereals (corn, wheat, oats), and to a smaller extent grapes. The ecoregion hosts a good variety of animal species, birds in particular, but most large mammals are in decline.

Forests 
The forest habitats of the ecoregion comprise mainly lowland and alti-montane mixed beech forests. There is also some natural beech woods, and the region also includes small parts of sub-Mediterranean forest habitats.

Fauna

Status and conservation 
Most of the original forest of the ecoregion has been cleared in the last 200 years, but a few larger patches remain, typically in non-arable montane areas that are part of national parks or protections. The woodlands of the ecoregion is generally second-growth and heavily fragmented.

National parks and larger nature protections in the ecoregion includes:

Luxembourg maintains the Upper Sûre Natural Park, but this park covers mostly the Upper Sûre Lake, an artificial dam created in 1959, and no land area of significance. The lake is an important bird area. Luxembourg also holds part of the cross-border German-Luxembourg Nature Park in addition to several smaller nature reservations. Here eco-typical patches of forest are growing.

Austria does not have any protections in this ecoregion.

External links

References 

Ecoregions of Austria
Ecoregions of Belgium
Ecoregions of the Czech Republic
Ecoregions of Europe
Ecoregions of France
Ecoregions of Metropolitan France
Ecoregions of Germany
Ecoregions of Poland
Ecoregions of Switzerland

Montane forests
Natural history of Luxembourg
Palearctic ecoregions
Temperate broadleaf and mixed forests